John Colt may refer to:

Baronets
Sir John Dutton Colt, 2nd Baronet (1725–1809), of the Colt baronets
Sir John Dutton Colt, 3rd Baronet (c. 1750–1810), of the Colt baronets
Sir John Dutton Colt, 4th Baronet (1774–1845), of the Colt baronets

Others
Johnny Colt, American musician
John Dutton Colt, MP for Leominster (UK Parliament constituency)
John C. Colt, fur-trader, book keeper, law clerk, teacher and Marine

See also
Colt (surname)